Jeremy Socorro Pulido (born 1 September 1999) is a Spanish footballer who plays as a left back for Antequera CF, on loan from CD Tenerife.

Club career
Born in Las Palmas, Canary Islands, Socorro was an UD Las Palmas youth graduate. On 3 August 2018, after finishing his formation, he moved to rivals CD Tenerife; initially assigned to the C-team, he featured regularly with the reserves in Tercera División during the season.

Socorro made his first team debut on 29 May 2022, starting in a 2–1 Segunda División home loss against FC Cartagena. On 24 June, he renewed his contract with Tenerife until 2024, but was loaned to Segunda Federación side Antequera CF on 1 September.

References

External links

1999 births
Living people
Footballers from Las Palmas
Spanish footballers
Association football defenders
Segunda División players
Segunda Federación players
Tercera División players
Tercera Federación players
CD Tenerife B players
CD Tenerife players
Antequera CF footballers